Born Innocent is the fifth studio album by Scottish rock duo The Proclaimers, released in 2003 on their own label, Persevere Records, and produced by Edwyn Collins.

Praised by AllMusic as "fiery" and a "return to form", Born Innocent reached No. 70 in the UK Albums Chart.

Background and recording

Recording and production 
Recording for Born Innocent betided in April and May 2003, both in Scotland at Castlesound Studios in Pencaitland, and at West Heath Yard in London. Born Innocent was produced by Edwyn Collins, frontman of Scottish post-punk band Orange Juice.

Release 
Born Innocent was released in the United Kingdom and Canada in 2003 on Persevere Records, and that year in Australia by Persevere and Shock Records jointly. It was issued in the U.S. in February 2004 with two bonus tracks, live versions of "Unguarded Moments" and "Born Innocent" that were recorded on 19 October 2003 at Carling Academy Glasgow.

Content

Musical style 
Paste Magazine typified the record's sound as "raw folk punk", blended with a "soulful, retro feel". Born Innocent encapsulated a variety of styles, including the hard rock of "Born Innocent" and the Cajun-influenced "Dear Deidre". The album's cover version of the Vogues' "Five O'Clock World" was likened by The Washington Post to the styling of English rock band The Animals, while AllMusic compared the politically-charged "Blood on Your Hands" to Midnight Oil's "more potent work".

Lyrics and themes 
The lyrics on Born Innocent concerned a variety of themes. "Blood on Your Hands" arraigned both Islamic Jihadists and American unilateralism, while "Role Model" slurred wealthy cocaine users.

Reception

Critical reception 

In a 4 out-of 5 star review, Hal Horowitz of AllMusic praised Born Innocent as a "soulful and energetic" effort, opining that the record "will appeal to longtime fans as well as newcomers".

Toby Jarvis from Drowned in Sound proclaimed Born Innocent "a firey winner", grading the record a score of 8 out-of 10.

Geoffrey Himes of The Washington Post adjudged Born Innocent to be "every bit as catchy and caustic as its predecessors".

Accolades 
In 2003, Born Innocent was ranked No. 26 for Mojo Magazine'''s "Albums of the Year".

 Allusions 
In a biographical account of the band's career, Timothy Monger of AllMusic'' described the record as "return to form with a fiery, raucous energy".

Track listing 
All songs written by Craig Reid and Charlie Reid except as indicated.

Chart

References 

2003 albums
Self-released albums
The Proclaimers albums